Thomas M. Tierney (February 25, 1919 – May 18, 2001) was an American administrator who served as the Director of the Bureau of Health Insurance from 1967 to 1978.

He died of cancer on May 18, 2001, in Baltimore, Maryland at age 82.

References

1919 births
2001 deaths
United States Department of Health and Human Services officials